The Colombian Aerospace Museum is an aerospace museum located near Tocancipá, Cundinamarca.

History
Founded in 1968, the museum was originally located at Techo International Airport. In 1972 it was moved to the Military Transport Air Command at El Dorado International Airport. In 1999, the museum took over the newly refurbished Military Transport Air Command offices and opened to the public in April 2001. The museum moved again to a location across from Jaime Duque Park, where it opened in November 2017.

Collection

 Beechcraft T-34 Mentor
 Bell UH-1B Iroquois
 Boeing 707
 Cessna A-37B Dragonfly
 Dassault Mirage 5COAM
 Douglas A-26 Invader
 Douglas C-54 Skymaster
 Gavilán G358
 Junkers Ju 52/3m
 Junkers W 34
 Lockheed C-60A Lodestar
 Lockheed C-130 Hercules
 Lockheed F-80 Shooting Star
 Lockheed T-33
 North American T-6 Texan
 Republic P-47 Thunderbolt

See also
List of aerospace museums

References

External links

 Official website

Aerospace museums
Museums established in 1968
Museums in Colombia